Main-group element-mediated activation of dinitrogen is the N2 activation facilitated by reactive main group element centered molecules (e.g., low valent main group metal Ca, dicoordinate borylene, boron radical, carbene, etc.).

Background 
Dinitrogen fixation is essential for human life. Currently, the industry uses the  Haber–Bosch process to convert N2 and H2 to NH3 based on the metal catalysis under very high pressure and temperature conditions. Alternative strategies that realize the transformation from N2 to NH3 under mild conditions are a long-lasting goal in chemistry. In the past decades, a number of transition-metal species have been found to bind (and even functionalize) N2. The prevalence of transition metals in dinitrogen activation is attributed to the fact that the unoccupied and occupied d orbitals could be both energetically and symmetrically accessible to accept electron density from and back donate to N2. Nevertheless, the development of low-valent, low-coordinate main-group elements which mimic the electronic properties of transition metal provides more opportunities to unearth the N2 activation by main group elements.

Lithium can also react with N2 at room temperature to give an isolable product Li3N. However, it was until recently that the controllable, stepwise N2 activation by main group element began to thrive, especially for those whose key intermediates were well structurally characterized and even isolated.

N2 activation by calcium
In 2021, Harder et al. achieved dinitrogen activation by a low-valent calcium complex, which was generated by the reduction of a calcium (II) complex [CaI(BDI)]2. With the presence of THF, the reduction of [CaI(BDI)]2 with K/KI could afford red-brown crystals. The single crystal X-ray analysis revealed a centrosymmetric dimer with terminal BDI ligands and side-on bridging N2 units. The N-N distance in complex (1.258(3) and 1.268(3) Å) is remarkably longer than that of dinitrogen triple-bond (1.098 Å) and comparable with N=N double bond character in N22-. The N22ˉ anion could also be protonated to diazene (N2H2) with the intramolecular deprotonation of THF under the heating condition.

N2 activation by boron 
Dicoordinate borylene has a filled p orbital and an empty sp-hybridized orbital in appropriate symmetry that can interact with inert small molecules like dinitrogen. In 2018, Braunschweig et al. reported the nitrogen fixation and reduction by active borylene species. [(CAAC)BDurBr2] could smoothly undergo one-electron reduction with the limited amount of KC8 (1.5 equiv.) and afford a radical complex [(CAAC)BDurBr]·. The radical complex could be further reduced, forming the transient dicoordinate borylene species and thus had the ability to activate dinitrogen. The filled p orbital of borylene, which acted as a Lewis base, donated to the π* antibonding orbital of N2. The empty sp2 orbital, which acted as a Lewis acid, accepted the electrons from N2 through σ donation. Following the further reduction by KC8 and stabilization by another borylene molecule, the dipotassium complex {[(CAAC)DurB]2(μ2-N2K2)} was formed in crystalline solid. Exposure of the dipotassium complex with ambient air and distilled water leads to the formation of dinitrogen bis(borylene) compound {[(CAAC)DurB]2(μ2-N2)} and a paramagnetic diradical complex {[(CAAC)DurB]2(μ2 -N2H2)}. Further protonation and reduction of {[(CAAC)DurB]2(μ2 -N2H2)} could lead to the cleavage of central N-N bond, which could finally lead to the formation of ammonium chloride in one-pot reaction.

Repeating the same reaction but replacing Dur (2,3,5,6-tetramethyl-phenyl) group by a bulkier Tip (2,4,6-triisopropylphenyl) group resulted in a very different result: after the dinitrogen was coordinated by the first borylene molecule, the second coordination by another borylene molecule was considerably hindered by steric repulsion in the case of the bulkier 4-Tip. Instead, the reductive dimerization of transient borylene [(CAAC)BTip] could occur in the presence of extra KC8, affording the complex {[(CAAC)-TipB]2(μ2-N4K2)}, a product with catenation of two N2 molecules, forming a N4 chain. It should be mentioned that this kind of coupling reaction was never found in the transition-metal-mediated N2 activation processes.

For borylene molecules, two-electron-filled p orbital and vacant sp2 orbital provide two push–pull channels to activate dinitrogen. Similarly, for boron radicals, one-electron-filled p orbital and vacant sp2 orbital provide two channels to activate N2. In 2022, Mézailles et al. reported the N2 activation by in situ generated boron-centered radicals. Though key intermediate which activated N2 is unclear, DFT calculation suggested that the coordination of N2 occurs prior to the second chloride elimination. Following the further reduction and coordination of boron, N2 was finally reduced to its lowest oxidation state and a mixture of two borylamine compounds, N(BCy2)3 and NH(BCy2)2, were generated.

N2 activation by carbon 

Carbene species have also been considered a good choice to activate N2. The decomposition of diazoalkanes with the release of N2 is one of the most widely used strategies to produce carbenes. Its reverse reaction could be considered as the activation of N2 with carbenes. For example, in 1992, Dailey et al. reported that the photolysis of 3-bromo-3-(trifluoromethyl)diazirines in an argon matrix could afford bromo(trifluoromethyl)carbene. Bromo(trifluoromethyl)carbene could rebound N2 photochemically in matrix to form the corresponding diazo compound.

References 

Chemical reactions